Federico Deflorian (9 June 1921 – 15 June 2003) was an Italian cross-country skier who competed in the 1950s. He finished 19th in the 18 km event at the 1952 Winter Olympics in Oslo.

Further notable results were:
 1949: 1st, Italian men's championships of cross-country skiing, 18 km
 1951: 3rd, Italian men's championships of cross-country skiing, 18 km
 1952: 1st, Italian men's championships of cross-country skiing, 18 km
 1953:
 1st, Italian men's championships of cross-country skiing, 30 km
 1st, Italian men's championships of cross-country skiing, 15 km
 1954:
 1st, Italian men's championships of cross-country skiing, 50 km
 2nd, Italian men's championships of cross-country skiing, 30 km
 1955:
 1st, Italian men's championships of cross-country skiing, 50 km
 1st, Italian men's championships of cross-country skiing, 30 km
 1st, Italian men's championships of cross-country skiing, 15 km
 1956:
 1st, Italian men's championships of cross-country skiing, 50 km
 1st, Italian men's championships of cross-country skiing, 15 km
 3rd, Italian men's championships of cross-country skiing, 30 km
 1957:
 1st, Italian men's championships of cross-country skiing, 50 km
 2nd, Italian men's championships of cross-country skiing, 30 km
 2nd, Italian men's championships of cross-country skiing, 15 km
 1958: 2nd, Italian men's championships of cross-country skiing, 30 km
 1959:
 1st, Italian men's championships of cross-country skiing, 50 km
 1st, Italian men's championships of cross-country skiing, 30 km

References

External links
 
 profile
 18 km Olympic cross country results: 1948–52

1921 births
2003 deaths
Olympic cross-country skiers of Italy
Cross-country skiers at the 1952 Winter Olympics
Cross-country skiers at the 1956 Winter Olympics
Cross-country skiers at the 1960 Winter Olympics
Italian male cross-country skiers